Philipp Oswald and Filip Polášek were the defending champions but chose not to defend their title.

Roberto Cid Subervi and Gonçalo Oliveira won the title after defeating Harri Heliövaara and Zdeněk Kolář 7–6(7–5), 4–6, [10–4] in the final.

Seeds

Draw

References

External links
 Main draw

Lisboa Belém Open - Doubles
2020 Doubles
2020 Lisboa Belém Open